Pinoy Pride or Filipino Pride is an exceptionalist outlook on being Filipino and is an expression of Filipino nationalism.

Pinoy pride is an assertion that the people and culture should promote the interests of the Philippines by developing, and maintaining a national identity based on largely shared characteristics such as language, race, religion or political goals.

Definition and manifestations

Different manifestations or observations concerning the Filipino people have been attributed to Pinoy Pride.

One of the more common manifestations of Pinoy pride is when Filipinos consider the success or victory of Philippine citizens or foreigners of Philippine descent—such as boxer Manny Pacquiao, chess prodigy Wesley So, singer, actress, and columnist Lea Salonga, singer Jake Zyrus, and American Idol season 11 runner-up Jessica Sanchez—as a national achievement.

The way Filipinos cope in the midst of natural disasters and problems, with some still maintaining a resolute attitude amidst such trials, has been attributed to the resiliency of the Filipino people as a whole.

Reception

The University of the Philippines Third World Studies Center has linked Pinoy Pride's manifestation of Filipino resiliency to German sociologist Ulrich Beck's concept of narrated attention, "where the parlance of resiliency ultimately detracts from, rather than allow for, a critical stance towards the zeitgeist of our time".

Dr. Norman G. Owen criticized the proliferation of hoaxes and exaggeration of historical facts in an effort to build on Pinoy Pride, such as the claim that a Filipino man named Agapito Flores was the inventor of the fluorescent lamp. Owen said that such exaggerations give an impression that by resorting to such acts, Filipinos, as a people do not have much to be proud of, which he believes, is not the original intention of such people engaged in such acts.

References

Exceptionalism
Philippine culture
Filipino nationalism